Bronowice may refer to:

Bronowice, Kraków, a district of Kraków, Poland (including former villages of Bronowice and Bronowice Małe)
Bronowice Małe, part of Bronowice district of Krakow
Bronowice Wielkie, part of the Prądnik Biały district of Kraków
Bronowice, Łódź Voivodeship (central Poland)
Bronowice, Lublin Voivodeship (east Poland)
Bronowice, Strzelce-Drezdenko County in Lubusz Voivodeship (west Poland)
Bronowice, Żary County in Lubusz Voivodeship (west Poland)